Arthur Tenn (born 15 March 1964) is a Jamaican former cyclist. He competed in the road race event at the 1984, 1988 and the 1992 Summer Olympics. He was the oldest cyclist to represent Jamaica at the Olympics. Ahead of the 2014 Commonwealth Games in Glasgow, Tenn was the President of the Jamaica Cycling Federation and the team manager of the Jamaican cycling team.

References

External links
 

1964 births
Living people
Jamaican male cyclists
Olympic cyclists of Jamaica
Cyclists at the 1984 Summer Olympics
Cyclists at the 1988 Summer Olympics
Cyclists at the 1992 Summer Olympics
Place of birth missing (living people)